The Rural Municipality of Shell River was a rural municipality (RM) in the Canadian province of Manitoba. It was incorporated as a rural municipality on December 22, 1883. On January 1, 2015 it was amalgamated as a result a provincial government mandate with the RM of Hillsburg and the Town of Roblin to form the Municipality of Hillsburg – Roblin – Shell River.

On January 1, 2007, the area of Park (North), which was a detached section of the former RM of Park, was added to the former RM of Shell River.

Communities 
 Boggy Creek
 Deepdale
 Makaroff
 San Clara
 Tummel
 Walkerburn
 Zelena

References 

 Manitoba Municipalities: Rural Municipality of Shell River

External links 
 Official website
 Map of former Park (North) R.M. at Statcan (2006 census)
 Map of Shell River R.M. at Statcan (2006 census)
 Map of Shell River R.M. at Statcan (current, 2011 census)

Shell River
Shell River
Populated places disestablished in 2015
2015 disestablishments in Manitoba